Jackson Bog or Jackson Bog State Nature Preserve is a  State Nature Preserve in the U.S. state of Ohio. It is owned by the Jackson Township Local Board of Education and the Ohio Division of Natural Areas and Preserves.

The bog, which is a fen, or alkaline bog, lies at the foot of a dry, sandy kame. The belts of kames in this area of Stark County provide an extensive aquifer. These highly permeable gravel deposits readily absorb surface water and then hold it in staggering quantities as groundwater. Whenever this groundwater reaches the surface, artesian springs and seeps result. Springs emerge from beneath the elongated kame that borders the northern edge of the preserve.

It is located in northern Stark County, in Jackson Township, near the city of Massillon, Ohio.

1980 establishments in Ohio
Kames
Ohio State Nature Preserves
Protected areas established in 1980
Protected areas of Stark County, Ohio
Bogs of Ohio
Landforms of Stark County, Ohio